Thor Larsen (20 July 1886 – 3 September 1970) was a Norwegian gymnast who competed in the 1908 Summer Olympics.

As a member of the Norwegian team, he won the silver medal in the gymnastics team event in 1908. He was born in Lommedalen, but represented the club Kristiania TF. He died in 1970 in Tønsberg and was buried there.

References

External links 
 
 

1886 births
1970 deaths
Sportspeople from Bærum
Norwegian male artistic gymnasts
Gymnasts at the 1908 Summer Olympics
Olympic gymnasts of Norway
Olympic silver medalists for Norway
Olympic medalists in gymnastics
Medalists at the 1908 Summer Olympics